Savannah is a town in the district of Bodden Town, Cayman Islands. With its close proximity to the territory's capital city, George Town, and housing being cheaper than in the capital, many opted to reside there. It is about a 10-minute drive from George Town. Savannah has one primary school, a post office, and a shopping center with a supermarket. There are a few restaurants and a café. Savannah is also the location of Pedro St. James Castle, which is the oldest building in the Cayman Islands and is often referred to as the “Birthplace of Democracy” in the islands, as the territory's first legislative body was formed there.

References

Populated places in the Cayman Islands